"Ku Vajti" is a song by Albanian singer and songwriter Elvana Gjata. The song was composed and written by Gjata together with Albanian producer Big Bang, who produced the song.

In its love-inspired lyrics, "Ku Vajti" makes reference to a past relationship in which Gjata questions her love interest where their passionate love has gone.

Background and composition 

"Ku Vajti" is an Albanian-language song with a duration time of two minutes and forty five seconds. Regarding the music notation, the song was composed in  time performed in the key of G minor in common time with a moderate tempo of 96 beats per minute. It was written and composed by Gjata herself together with Albanian producer Big Bang who was additionally responsible for the production of the song.

Critical reception 

Following its release, "Ku Vajti" was met with favourable reviews from music critics. Shqip FM took into consideration the song's hit potential and also praised its profound message, the choreography and Elvana's emotional delivery. An editor of Top Channel was similarly positive towards the choreography and commended it as "fabulous" and "very rhythmic". However, another editor from TV Klan noticed similarities to the singles "New Rules" and "IDGAF" by English singer Dua Lipa.

Music video 

An accompanying music video for "Ku Vajti" officially premiered onto the YouTube channel of Elvana Gjata on 18 June 2018, where it has since amassed a total of more than 38 million views. It was later released on digital platforms and to streaming services as a single on 20 June 2018 through East Music Matters.

Personnel 

Credits adapted from YouTube and Tidal.

 Elvana Gjatacomposing, songwriting, vocals
 Arbër Gjikolli (Big Bang)composing, production, songwriting
 Albi Nakochoreography

Charts

Release history

References 

2018 singles
2018 songs
Elvana Gjata songs
Albanian-language songs
Songs written by Elvana Gjata
Song recordings produced by Big Bang